The  was a corps-level ad hoc Japanese army in the Second Sino-Japanese War.

The Shanghai Expeditionary Army was first raised on February 25, 1932 as a reinforcement for Japanese forces involved during the First Battle of Shanghai. It was dissolved in June 1932, after the conclusion of that incident. Ethnic Chinese soldiers from the Taiwan Army were part of this army, and they were led by Iwane Matsui.

The Shanghai Expeditionary Army was raised a second time on August 15, 1937 on the eruption of full scale hostilities between the Empire of Japan and the Republic of China. Its forces participated in the Second Battle of Shanghai, and the subsequent drive inland to the Battle of Nanking. Troops from this army were also involved in the subsequent Nanjing Massacre.

The Shanghai Expeditionary Army was disbanded on February 1, 1938, and its component units were incorporated into the Japanese Central China Area Army.

Organization 1932
See: Order of Battle January 28 Incident

Organization 1937-1938
See: Order of battle of the Battle of Shanghai

List of commanders

Commanding officer

Chief of Staff

References

External links

Japanese armies
Military units and formations established in 1932
Military units and formations disestablished in 1938
Expeditionary units and formations
Nanjing Massacre perpetrators